The Triavio Italo (Italian) is an Italian ultralight aircraft, designed and produced by Triavio of Catania, introduced at the AERO Friedrichshafen show in 2013. The aircraft is intended to be supplied as a kit for amateur construction or complete and ready-to-fly.

Design and development
The Italo was designed to comply with the Fédération Aéronautique Internationale microlight rules and US light-sport aircraft (LSA) rules. It will also be available as a homebuilt aircraft kit. It features a cantilever low-wing, an enclosed cockpit with two-seats-in-side-by-side configuration under a bubble canopy, retractable tricycle landing gear and a single engine in tractor configuration.

The aircraft is made from sheet aluminum. Its  span wing employs slotted flaps. Standard engines available will be the  Rotax 912ULS and 912iS four-stroke powerplants.

The design was shown at the 2013 AERO Friedrichshafen show, but was still under development in 2015 and was not yet advertised for sale on the company website in March 2017.

A future LSA version is planned, but as of March 2017, the design does not appear on the Federal Aviation Administration's list of approved special light-sport aircraft.

Specifications (Italo)

References

External links

Italo
2010s Italian ultralight aircraft
Homebuilt aircraft
Light-sport aircraft
Single-engined tractor aircraft